After Hours: Forward to Scotland's Past is the second compilation released by The Battlefield Band. It  was released in 1987 on the Temple Records label.

Track listing
 "After Hours/The Green Gates/The Ship in Full Sail" – 3:30
 "Frideray" – 2:54
 "A Chance as Good as Any/Reid's Rant" – 3:19
 "Anthem" – 3:28
 "The Dear Green Place" – 4:46
 "Look Across the Water/Mrs. Garden of the Troup/The Keelman Ower Land" – 4:26
 "Green Plaid" – 3:46
 "Mary Cassidy" – 2:30
 "I Am the Common Man" – 2:58
 "St. Kilda Girl's Lament/The St. Kilda Wedding March" – 2:51
 "The Lads O' The Fair" – 4:00
 "Sauchiehall Street Salsa (McHugh's Other Foot) (The Man With Two Woman)" – 3:09
 "The Boar and the Fox" – 4:04
 "Battle of Waterloo/Kilcoy's March/The Quaker" – 5:08
 "The Snows of France and Holland" – 3:37
 "Bad Moon Rising/The Rising Moon Reel" – 3:17

References

External links
 

Battlefield Band albums
1987 albums